Women's Legion was a British charitable organisation created in 1915 by Edith Vane-Tempest-Stewart, the Marchioness of Londonderry. Its first general secretary (to 1918) was Rose Bradley, daughter of George Granville Bradley, Dean of Westminster. It comprised volunteers who wore military-style uniforms and took on various duties within agriculture, canteen, cookery and motor transport sections. More than 40,000 women joined its forces.

References

Charities based in the United Kingdom
Organizations established in 1915
1915 establishments in the United Kingdom
Organizations with year of disestablishment missing
Women's organisations based in the United Kingdom